Igreja da Graça  is a church in Portugal. It is classified as a National Monument.

Churches in Coimbra District
National monuments in Coimbra District